Théodore Pascal Fages (born 23 August 1994) is a French professional rugby league footballer who plays as a  and  for the Huddersfield Giants in the Betfred Super League and  France at international level.

He previously played for the Salford Red Devils in the Super League. He played as a  earlier in his career.

Background
He is the son of former French international Pascal Fages who appeared for France in the 1995 Rugby League World Cup. Théo replicated his father's achievements in playing for France at a World Cup when he captained his nation at the 2017 Rugby League World Cup.

Club career

Salford Red Devils
Fages joined Salford as a 16-year-old, progressing through the club's academy system. He made his Super League début for Salford in the first match of the 2013's Super League XVIII in a defeat by Wigan Warriors; the following week he played against Catalans Dragons and was knocked unconscious in the opening minutes of the match by Julian Bousquet, which resulted in a red card for the Catalan player.

In 2015, Fages submitted a transfer request to leave Salford, with Salford owner Marwan Koukash demanding a world record transfer fee for the player.

St Helens
On Tuesday 22 September, it was announced that Fages would be released from the Salford club, following receipt of an undisclosed transfer fee. Two days later it was announced that he would join St. Helens from 2016.

On 3 June 2019 Fages signed a contract extension keeping him at St Helens until 2021

He played in the 2019 Challenge Cup Final defeat by the Warrington Wolves at Wembley Stadium.

He played in the 2019 Super League Grand Final victory over the Salford Red Devils at Old Trafford.

Theo scored his first drop goal for St Helens in the Golden point win against Hull Kingston Rovers on 11 September 2020

Fages played in St Helens 8-4 2020 Super League Grand Final victory over Wigan at the Kingston Communications Stadium in Hull.

Fages played for St. Helens in their 2021 Challenge Cup Final victory over Castleford.

Huddersfield Giants
On the 13 October 2021, it was confirmed that Fages would be joining Huddersfield Giants from 2022.
Fages made his club debut for Huddersfield in round 1 of the 2022 Super League season where they defeated Toulouse Olympique 42-14.

International career
Fages made his début for France in the victory over Papua New Guinea at the 2013 Rugby League World Cup, and went on to make one further appearance in the tournament.

He played in the 2014 European Cup, scoring his first try for France in a victory over Wales.

He was named captain of the French team prior to the 2015 European Cup. In the tournament he scored against Ireland (1 try).

References

External links

St Helens profile
France profile
2017 RLWC profile
SL profile
Saints Heritage Society profile

1994 births
Living people
France national rugby league team captains
France national rugby league team players
French rugby league players
Huddersfield Giants players
Rugby league halfbacks
Rugby league five-eighths
Salford Red Devils players
St Helens R.F.C. players